Jandré Blom (born 24 December 1984) is a South African professional rugby union player, currently playing with the . His regular position is scrum-half.

Career

Youth
At youth level, Blom played for the  team in the 2002 Under-19 competition, as well as the  team in 2005.

Free State Cheetahs
He was first included in a senior squad when he made the  squad for the 2005 Vodacom Cup competition and made several appearances for them in this competition over the next four seasons. As the main kicker of the team, he finished as the fourth top points scorer in 2007 with 73 points.

Just one more appearance followed that season, but he was also included in the  squad for the 2008 Super 14 season, but failed to make an appearance, instead playing in the 2008 Vodacom Cup, where he was tenth top scorer with 2008 with 73 points.

He was once again fourth in the scoring charts for the 2009 Vodacom Cup competition, scoring 99 points.

SWD Eagles

Griquas
He then had a spell at  during the 2011 Vodacom Cup competition, making five appearances.

Return to SWD Eagles
In 2013, he returned to the  prior to the 2013 Currie Cup First Division season.

Sevens
He was included in the South Africa Sevens squad for the IRB Sevens World Series in 2005–06 and 2006–07 and played in the 2005 Dubai Sevens, 2005 South Africa Sevens, 2007 USA Sevens and 2007 Wellington Sevens competitions.

References

South African rugby union players
Living people
1984 births
Free State Cheetahs players
Griffons (rugby union) players
Griquas (rugby union) players
SWD Eagles players
South Africa international rugby sevens players